The 2017 BWF Grand Prix Gold and Grand Prix was the eleventh season of the BWF Grand Prix Gold and Grand Prix.

Schedule
Below is the schedule released by Badminton World Federation:

Results

Winners

Performance by countries
Tabulated below are the Grand Prix performances based on countries. Only countries who have won a title are listed:

Grand Prix Gold

Malaysia Masters

Syed Modi International

Thailand Masters

German Open

Swiss Open

China Masters

Thailand Open

Chinese Taipei Open

U.S. Open

New Zealand Open

Bitburger Open

Macau Open

Korea Masters

Grand Prix

Canada Open

Russian Open

Vietnam Open

Dutch Open

Scottish Open

References

2017 in badminton
2017